This list includes transfers featuring at least one club from either the Premier League or the EFL Championship that were completed after the end of the summer 2019 transfer window on 8 August and before the closure of the 2020 winter transfer window on 31 January 2020. Players without a club may be signed at any time, clubs may sign players on loan dependent on their league's regulations, and clubs may sign a goalkeeper on an emergency loan if they have no registered senior goalkeeper available.

Transfers 
All players and clubs without a flag are English. Note that while Cardiff City and Swansea City are affiliated with the Football Association of Wales and thus take the Welsh flag, they play in the English Championship, and so their transfers are included here.

Loans

References

England
Winter 2019-20